Saint-André-sur-Orne (literally Saint-André on Orne; named Saint-André-de-Fontenay until 1911) is a village in the Calvados department in the Normandy region in northwestern France.

Geography
Saint-André-sur-Orne is situated on the Orne River, 7 km south of Caen and 35 km south-east of Bayeux.

History
The village's history is closely linked to the Saint Stephen abbey "Abbaye Saint-Étienne-de-Fontenay" founded on his land of Fontenay by Raoul Tesson around 1047 under the patronage of Duke William of Normandy (before he became King of England following his victory in Hastings in 1066) and which survived until the French Revolution at the end of the 18th century. Most of the abbey was destroyed at the beginning of the 19th century, but there still remains a 13th-century building along the Orne river, and the abbot's more "modern" house (not visited) rebuilt at the beginning of the 18th century.

The village witnessed the expulsion of many schoolchildren from the "Maison du Clos" by the Nazi army during World War II, but the marching children were then rescued by Allied soldiers. The village was finally liberated in July 1944 by Canadian soldiers, many of whom died in this fierce battle, hence the street names of "Royal Black Watch" (the Montreal-based regiment) and the village's main street "Rue des Canadiens". Their bodies are buried in the Bretteville-sur-Laize Canadian War Cemetery in the nearby village of Cintheaux.

Population

See also
Communes of the Calvados department

References

Communes of Calvados (department)
Calvados communes articles needing translation from French Wikipedia